A national numbering agency (NNA) is the organisation in each country responsible for issuing International Securities Identification Numbers (ISIN) as described by the ISO 6166 standard and the Classification of Financial Instruments code as described by the ISO 10962 standard.  The role of NNA is typically assigned to the national stock exchange, central bank, or financial regulator but may be as diverse as a financial data provider or clearing and custodian organisation for that country.

There is a global governing body that coordinates the work of the NNAs called the Association of National Numbering Agencies (ANNA).

List of NNAs by country

References

External links 
 Association of National Numbering Agencies (ANNA)

Financial regulation
International economic organizations